Louis Porion (1 August 1805 – 9 January 1858) was a French politician. He served as a member of the National Assembly from 1848 to 1851, representing Somme. He was also the mayor of Amiens from 1848 to 1851.

References

1805 births
1858 deaths
People from Amiens
Mayors of places in Hauts-de-France
Party of Order politicians
Orléanists
Members of the 1848 Constituent Assembly
Members of the National Legislative Assembly of the French Second Republic